Megaulacobothrus latipennis is a species of grasshopper classified under the subfamily Gomphocerinae, recorded from Japan, Korea and Taiwan. The scientific name of this species was published for the first time in 1898 by Bolívar.

References 

Gomphocerinae
Insects described in 1898
Orthoptera of Asia